Cardinal Vannutelli may refer to:

 Serafino Vannutelli (1834-1915), Italian Roman Catholic cardinal, older brother of Vincenzo 
 Vincenzo Vannutelli (1836-1930), Italian Roman Catholic cardinal, younger brother of Serafino